Home Improvement: Power Tool Pursuit! is a 2D platform game for the Super Nintendo Entertainment System based on the sitcom of the same name. A Sega Genesis version was planned but never released.

Plot
On a special broadcast of the show Tool Time, Tim Taylor prepares to unveil the new Binford ultra power tool line named after him, the Binford-Taylor Turbo Power Tool Line. He goes to retrieve the tools, only to discover that they are missing. A note is left in their place demanding Tim to traverse the different sets where other shows are being filmed to recover the tools.

Gameplay
The player's weapons include modified tools such as a nail gun, a blowtorch (used as a flamethrower), and a saw which hurls energy waves.  These weapons are used to fight dinosaurs, acid-spewing mummies, robot sentries, and other enemies. The game is broken down into four worlds of four levels, each world containing a boss level. The game had no real instruction manual, in its place, a fake manual was used with a sticker reading "Real Men Don't Need Instructions", a message which also appears on the splash screen.

Development 
Home Improvement: Power Tool Pursuit! was published by Absolute Entertainment, which Disney hired the company to produce the game after it completed another video game based on a Disney property, Goofy's Hysterical History Tour (1993). It was presented at the 1994 winter Consumer Electronics Show.

Reception 

Reviews at the time were generally mixed-to-positive, while the sitcom adaptation's concept of Tim Allen fighting through fantastical enemies such as mummies, dinosaurs and robots led it to appear on several all-time lists of weirdest video games, such as those of PC Magazine and Rolling Stone, in later years.

GamePro gave Home Improvement: Power Tool Pursuit! a mixed review, calling it "like Pitfall with power tools". They commented that the game plays well and is easy to pick up on, has solid graphics, but features mediocre music, and concluded that it would be fun for side-scrolling fans and enthusiasts of the TV show, but is not challenging enough for hardcore players. Mike Weigand of Electronic Gaming Monthly called it "an intriguing action title, with some cool weapons and excellent graphics". Less favorable towards the game was Entertainment Weekly, which was turned off by the concept of Tim Allen fighting enemies like dinosaurs and "alien beasties"; and Nintendo Power, claiming that despite its "fun worlds" and many type of attacks, it suffered from "awkward" controls", "poor placement of objects" that artificially increased the difficulty, absence of humor from the TV series, and the fact that the "gameplay never rises above standard jumping, shooting and the collecting of items".

Notes

References

External links 
 Home Improvement (SNES) at GameSpot
 

1994 video games
Absolute Entertainment games
Cancelled Sega Genesis games
Home Improvement (TV series)
Imagineering (company) games
North America-exclusive video games
Platform games
Single-player video games
Super Nintendo Entertainment System games
Super Nintendo Entertainment System-only games
Video games based on television series
Video games developed in the United States